The National Academy of Handball (commonly abbreviated NEKA) is a Hungarian state-funded handball training and developing center run by the Hungarian Handball Federation. Located in Balatonboglár, it offers an integrated four year education for students in grades 9–12. In addition, it is open for Hungarian international junior handballers (aged 18–21) under a trilateral agreement between the academy, the players' club and the players itself.

Entry conditions
The academy is open for those of 14 years old girls and boys who completed the eighth grade, but has to pass the professional sports input requirements:
 Sports physician certification
 Expert's report on the resilience of the spine
 Anthropometric measurements
 Psychological test
 Measurement of motor skills (running speed, dynamic leg strength, throwing power, game skills in match situation)

The first semester of the school set to begin in autumn 2013 with 30 girls and 30 boys, subsequently new classes will be launched in every 3 years.

It is not mandatory for junior international handballers to join the academy, however, if they do so, at the end of their training period they are free to return to their previous club.

Facilities
 Accommodation for the academists in residential system in a formerly three star hotel (150 rooms)
 Restaurant, kitchen, education and training areas in the building
 800-seats capacity handball arena, suitable for international matches
 Gym, swimming pool, sauna, regeneration and rehabilitation facilities
 Specific training sites for individual theoretical and practical training
 Sports medicine, physiology and diagnostic center
 Personality development, distance learning, and competency-based training opportunities

Academy personnel
The technical staff of the academy is independent from clubs and most of them associatied with the Hungarian national teams.

Staff as of 2022
 Lajos Mocsai – academy director, master coach
 Tamás Mocsai – academy manager, former handball player
 János Hajdu – technical director, master coach, former head coach of the Hungarian national teams in younger age categories (women's teams)
 Beáta Bohus – EHF master coach, head coach of the Hungarian national teams in younger age categories (women's teams)
 Beáta Siti – certified coach, former assistant coach of the Hungary women's national handball team
 László Sótonyi – EHF master coach
 Szilárd Kiss Sr. – master coach
 Szilárd Kiss Jr. – EHF master coach, head coach of Hungarian national teams in younger age categories (women's teams)
 Péter Woth – EHF master coach, assistant coach of Hungarian national teams in younger age categories (women's teams)
 Béla Bartalos – goalkeeping coach
 Edit Vári – athletics coach
 Zsolt Varga – coach
 Zsolt Kopornyik – coach
 Zoltán Lehőcz – coach
 Zsolt Szobol – coach
 Zsolt Perger – goalkeeping coach
 Ákos Vártok – goalkeeping coach
 György Zsigmond

Men's team

Kits

Current squad
Squad for the 2021–22 season

TransfersTransfers for the 2021–22 seasonJoining 

  Bence Mikita (CB) from  CB San Jose Obrero
  László Szeitl (LP) from  Veszprém KKFT Felsőörs
  Mátyás Simotics (LP) from  Vecsési SE
  Axel Kiss (RW) from  Orosházi FKSE
  Kristóf Palasics (GK) from  BFKA-Veszprém U22
  Erhárd Sisa (LW) from  BFKA-Veszprém U22
  Dániel Fekete (LB) from  Pick Szeged
  Brunó Bajus (LW) on loan from  Pick Szeged
  Gellért Draskovics (LB) on loan from  Balatonfüredi KSE

Leaving 

  Dávid Foki (CB) to  PLER KC
  Dominik Kovács (LW) to  Budakalász FKC
  Márk Dávid (LP) to  Békési FKC
  László Szeitl (LP) to  Csurgói KK

Honours

Recent seasons
Seasons in Nemzeti Bajnokság I: 1
Seasons in Nemzeti Bajnokság I/B: 5

Women's team

The first team of NEKA has regularly competed in the Nemzeti Bajnokság I/B. For the 2020–21 season they signed an agreement with Szent István SE that the two teams would unite and compete as one team in the Nemzeti Bajnokság I under the name Boglári Akadémia-SZISE. The union is often referred to as SZISE-NEKA.

Kits

Current squadSquad for the 2022–23 season''

Former club members

Notable former players

Women's team
  Anna Albek
  Csenge Fodor (2013–2017)
  Lili Herczeg
  Míra Vámos
  Noémi Pásztor (2013–2017)
  Natalie Schatzl
  Nina Szabó
  Petra Vámos (2014–2019)
  Viktória Woth (2017–2021)

Men's team
  Bence Bartha 
  Bence Bálint 
  Nándor Bognár 
  Uros Borzas 
  Marcell Gábor 
  Kristóf Győri
  Zoran Ilic
  Zsolt Schäffer

Former coaches

Women's team

Men's team

References

External links
  
 

Hungarian handball clubs
Somogy County